The 2015 Roye shooting took place at 4.30 pm in a Roma camp in Roye (Somme, Picardy, France) on Tuesday, August 25, 2015 and saw the death of 4 people in a travellers' camp; a policeman and three people from the same family (a six-month-old baby, his mother and his father). The suspect also seriously wounded a three-year-old child, before police shot and injured him as they carried out an arrest. The injured were all taken to the Amiens University Hospital by helicopter.

References

Spree shootings in France
August 2015 events in France
August 2015 crimes in Europe
2015 crimes in France
2015 mass shootings in Europe
Family murders